Robert Warren Dale Shakespeare (27 September 1953 – 8 December 2021) was a Jamaican bass guitarist and record producer, best known as half of the reggae rhythm section and production duo Sly and Robbie, with drummer Sly Dunbar. Regarded as one of the most influential reggae bassists, Shakespeare was also known for his creative use of electronics and production effects units. He was sometimes nicknamed "Basspeare".

As a part of Sly and Robbie, Shakespeare worked with various reggae artists such as U-Roy, Peter Tosh, Bunny Wailer, Dennis Brown, Gregory Isaacs, Sugar Minott, Augustus Pablo, Yellowman, and Black Uhuru. His production work also extended beyond the reggae genre, covering various pop and rock artists such as Mick Jagger, Bob Dylan, Jackson Browne, Cyndi Lauper, Joe Cocker, Yoko Ono, Serge Gainsbourg, and Grace Jones. Prior to his involvement in Sly and Robbie, he was a member of the session groups the Revolutionaries and the Aggrovators.

Career
Shakespeare grew up in East Kingston, Jamaica. He had a musical family, such that "his family home was a rehearsal and hangout spot for a variety of upcoming musicians and singers." His brother Lloyd had a band called the Emotions which rehearsed in the house. Shakespeare's first instrument was an acoustic guitar that was always present in the home. Later, the bass player Aston "Family Man" Barrett came into his yard, as it was near a popular location for selling marijuana. Shakespeare had been trying acoustic guitar and drums, but when he heard Family Man's bass playing, he was attracted to the deep bass sound. Shakespeare recalled saying "I wan fi learn how to play this thing [bass]. You haffi teach me", and Barrett agreed to give Shakespeare bass lessons.

Shakespeare first went in a music studio when he helped carry Family Man's brother Carlton Barrett's drums into the studio and help set up the drums. This developed into sneaking into the studio and waiting outside as bands recorded. Whenever Family Man recorded, Shakespeare would try to both listen to the session and watch the bass player's hands; afterwards at Shakespeare's family house, the bassist would show Shakespeare in person the basslines that had been recorded.

Shakespeare continued to study electric bass with Aston Barrett, the bass player from the Upsetters. He collaborated with the drummer Sly Dunbar for the first time when they played in the Channel One Studio house band, which was called the Revolutionaries. After Barrett joined the Wailers, Shakespeare took over the bass role in Barrett's former group, Hippy Boys. In 1979, Shakespeare and Dunbar started an independent music production company and record label called Taxi Records.

Death
Shakespeare died following kidney surgery in Florida, on 8 December 2021, at the age of 68.
Reports state that the musician had been suffering from kidney related issues, including a rejected organ, and was on dialysis.

Equipment

Basses
 Höfner 500/1 bass
Fender Jazz bass
Schecter eight-string bass
PRS bass

Amps
Markbass SA 450
Markbass TA 503

Selected discography

Sly and Robbie albums
 Language Barrier (1985)
 Rhythm Killers (1987)
 Taxi Fare (1987)
 Friends (1998)
 Rhythm Doubles (2006)
 Dubrising (2014)

Collaborations
With Grace Jones
 Warm Leatherette (Island Records, 1980)
 Nightclubbing (Island Records, 1981)
 Living My Life (Island Records, 1982)
 Hurricane (PIAS Recordings, 2008)

With Jackson Browne
 World in Motion (Elektra Records, 1989)

With Peter Tosh
 Legalize It (Columbia Records, 1976)
 Equal Rights (EMI, 1977)
 Bush Doctor (EMI, 1978)
 Mystic Man (EMI, 1979)
 Wanted Dread & Alive (Capitol Records, 1981)
 Mama Africa (EMI, 1983)

With Joe Cocker
 Sheffield Steel (Island Records, 1982)

With Simply Red
 Life (East West Records, 1995)
 Blue (East West Records, 1998)

With Ian Dury
 Lord Upminster (Polydor Records, 1981)

With Gary Barlow
 Sing (Decca Records, 2012)

With Ziggy Marley and the Melody Makers
 Hey World! (EMI, 1986)

With Sting
 44/876 (A&M Records, 2018)

With Joan Armatrading
 Walk Under Ladders (A&M Records, 1981)

With Gwen Guthrie
 Gwen Guthrie (Island Records, 1982)
 Portrait (Island Records, 1983)

With Sinéad O'Connor
 Throw Down Your Arms (Chocolate and Vanilla, 2005)
 Theology (Rubyworks Records, 2007)

With Garland Jeffreys
 Don't Call Me Buckwheat (BMG, 1991)

With Carly Simon
 Hello Big Man (Warner Bros. Records, 1983)

With Jimmy Cliff
 Follow My Mind (Reprise Records, 1975)
 Give the People What They Want (MCA Records, 1981)
 Cliff Hanger (CBS Records, 1985)
 Humanitarian (Eureka Records, 1999)

With Jenny Morris
 Honeychild (East West, 1991)

With Mick Jagger
 She's the Boss (Columbia Records, 1985)

With Bob Dylan
 Infidels (Columbia Records, 1983)
 Empire Burlesque (Columbia Records, 1985)
 Down in the Groove (Columbia Records, 1988)

With Yoko Ono
 Starpeace (PolyGram Records, 1985)

Appearances in media
Shakespeare appeared in the 2011 documentary Reggae Got Soul: The Story of Toots and the Maytals which was featured on BBC and described as "The untold story of one of the most influential artists ever to come out of Jamaica" (see Toots and the Maytals). Both Robbie and Sly were featured in the recording sessions of the album Hurricane by Grace Jones, in the documentary Grace Jones: Bloodlight and Bami, by Sophie Fiennes, about the model/singer Grace Jones.

References

External links

 

1953 births
2021 deaths
Jamaican reggae musicians
Jamaican bass guitarists
Jamaican record producers
Dub musicians
Musicians from Kingston, Jamaica
Jamaican session musicians
Jamaican male musicians